Rush County is the name of two counties in the United States:

 Rush County, Indiana
 Rush County, Kansas